Education in Brunei is provided or regulated by the Government of Brunei through the Ministry of Education and the Ministry of Religious Affairs.

Formal education comprises compulsory, post-secondary and higher education. Compulsory education may be of two types: general education which takes twelve years and consists of pre-school, primary and secondary; and Islamic religious primary education which lasts seven years and is compulsory for Muslim pupils in Brunei. General education may be attained in government or private schools, where as religious education is attained in government religious schools.

Post-secondary education may consist of sixth form, which is an extension of secondary and allows direct entrance to higher education; and technical and vocational education which are provided in government institutions and private colleges. Higher education from bachelor's degree is provided in four government universities. Schooling for compulsory education is fully subsidised by the government for the citizens of Brunei and it usually extends to post-secondary and university.

Although Malay is the official language of Brunei, English is the main medium of instruction in most primary and secondary schools as well as colleges and universities. Nevertheless, Malay is the medium of instruction for Malay- and Brunei-related subjects, as well as in religious primary schools. The latter also adopts Jawi alphabet, a Perso-Arabic script, instead of Roman alphabet. Arabic is used in Arabic religious schools and Islamic universities. Chinese may be used as a medium of instruction or as a subject in Chinese private schools.

As of 2019, the Ministry of Education administered or oversaw 232 schools in the preschool, primary and secondary levels, 12 technical and vocational institutions, and 7 universities and other tertiary-level institutions. A total of 107,166 students were enrolled, whereby  were female. In the same year, the Ministry of Religious Affairs administered 158 Islamic religious schools, employing 2,205 teachers and enrolling 36,926 students.

School grades

General education

Preschool 
Children's education in Brunei may start from kindergartens. They are optional prior to the preschool of compulsory education and only available in non-government schools.

Compulsory education begins with a one-year preschool (commonly known as ), expected at the age of 5.

Primary 
Primary education follows preschool and lasts for six years, beginning from Year 1 until Year 6. Prior to the current education system , the primary years were formerly known by the name 'Primary' ('') and adopt Roman numerals, e.g. 'Primary IV'. Primary education ends with the national examination  ("Primary School Assessment", commonly known as PSR).

Secondary 
Secondary education is compulsory and generally lasts for five years, beginning from Year 7 until Year 11. Year 7 and 8 constitutes Lower Secondary and culminates with the Student Progress Assessment (SPA). Year 9 until Year 11 constitutes Upper Secondary and ends with national examination Brunei-Cambridge GCE Ordinary Level (commonly known as O Level).

Prior to SPN21, Lower Secondary constituted three years and began with Form I (one) until Form III (three). Upper Secondary encompassed two years, Form IV (four) and Form V (five), and culminated in the sitting of O Level examination as today.

Primary students who have achieved A's in all five subjects in PSR are eligible to study in 'science schools', a type of secondary school with emphasis on science-related curriculum. In normal secondary schools, students who have done well in Lower Secondary academics may also be put in 'science stream' classes which emphasise studying science-related subjects in greater breadth and depth, in particular studying Physics, Biology and Chemistry as separate subjects instead of under one subject 'Science'.

Students may opt for a shorter 2 years of Upper Secondary, subject to evaluation of academic records of Lower Secondary.

Sixth form 
Students who have met certain academic requirements from O Level may opt for sixth form. It is optional and lasts for 2 years which consists of Year 12 and Year 13, or Lower Six and Upper Six. At the end of Year 13, students sit for the national examination Brunei-Cambridge GCE Advanced Level (commonly known as A Level). The academic results from the exam will determine entry into universities both local and abroad, in particular in UK universities.

Islamic religious education 
Formal Islamic religious education in Brunei is overseen by the Ministry of Religious Affairs and mainly comprises the religious primary education and the Arabic religious education.

Religious primary 
It lasts for seven years which comprise preschool and Primary I (one) to Primary VI (six), similar to primary level in general education. Entry to the preschool is usually at age 7, equivalent to Year 2 in general primary education. At the end of Primary VI, students sit for the standardized examination  (translates as "Religious Primary Schools Certificate").

The education is only provided in government religious schools. They may have dedicated grounds and buildings, or may share facilities with the general primary or secondary schools. The  session is generally held in the afternoon, that is after primary or secondary session which is held in the morning until noon. Some religious schools may also have morning session.

The medium of instruction is Malay and the writing system uses Jawi script, a derivative of Arabic script. Jawi is an official script in Brunei.

Arabic religious 
The Arabic Islamic religious education is a type of secondary education which specialises in subjects pertaining to Islamic religion. It is an alternative pathway for Muslim students in lieu of the general secondary education. The medium of instruction is Arabic. The culmination of this pathway allows students for entry into Islamic universities, local and abroad, in particular Al-Azhar University in Cairo, Egypt. The education in only provided in dedicated government schools.

Entry into the education is determined through a standardised entrance examination usually taken upon Year 4 of general primary education. The Arabic education begins with a 2-year Arabic preparatory, followed by a five-year secondary and a two-year sixth form.

The Arabic secondary schools may also provide general secondary education as an option which culminates in O and A Levels.

See also
 List of universities in Brunei

References

External links 
 Ministry of Education